Albania competed at the 2022 European Athletics Championships in Munich from 15 August to 21 August 2022.

Medallists

Results

Albania entered the following athletes. 
 Women 
 Track and road

See also
Albania at the 2022 European Championships

References

2022
Nations at the 2022 European Athletics Championships
European Athletics Championships